Fahd Mohammad Musa Jaradat (1930 – 19 May 2015) was a Jordanian soldier and politician who served as Minister of Finance in 1970.

Jaradat was born in Bushra in 1930. He joined the Jordanian Armed Forces in 1948. He amongst others held the post of military attaché in Iran.

In 1970 he was named Finance Minister.

References

1930 births
2015 deaths
Finance ministers of Jordan
Jordanian military personnel
People from Irbid Governorate